The Arab Mashreq International Railway is a proposed railway network in the Mashriq, which is located in Western Asia and eastern North Africa in the eastern part of the Arab world. The planned network has north–south and east–west axes, and 16 different routes covering 19500 route-km. The plan is ambitious; 60% of the routes have not yet been built, and parts of existing railway infrastructure are weak or have gauge differences; some states may be unable to make large investments in infrastructure. Like the European Trans-European Transport Network, the Agreement specifies a family of high-priority international routes, rather than setting service details or awarding contracts to operators.

International agreement
The Agreement on International Railways in the Arab Mashreq was adopted on 17 April 2003. It entered into force on 23 May 2005 after it had been ratified by Egypt, Jordan, Lebanon and Syria. As of July 2016, it has been ratified by 12 states: Bahrain, Egypt, Iraq, Jordan, Kuwait, Lebanon, Saudi Arabia, the State of Palestine, Sudan, Syria, United Arab Emirates, and Yemen.

Routes

 R05: Iraq - Kuwait - Saudi Arabia
 R15: Jordan - Saudi Arabia
 R25: Syria - Jordan - Saudi Arabia - Yemen
 R27: Syria
 R35: Syria - Lebanon
 R45: Egypt
 R10: Iraq - Syria
 R20: Syria
 R30: Syria - Lebanon
 R40: Iraq - Jordan
 R50: Gaza - Egypt
 R60: Egypt
 R70: Egypt
 R80: Saudi Arabia
 R82: Qatar
 R90: Oman - Yemen

Jordan
Jordan joined OTIF in August 2010, and plans to become a hub for international rail transport. In 2011-2014, Jordan's Ministry of Transport plans to invest €2·6bn in rail infrastructure connected to the Arab Mashreq International Railway Network.

Technical standards

See also
 Gulf Railway

References

Proposed public transport in Asia
Proposed rail infrastructure in Saudi Arabia
International railway lines
International railway lines in Asia